Radio Reloj (Spanish for Radio Clock) is an internationally broadcast Spanish-language radio station, located in Cuba. It currently carries an all-news format. The station is noted for the sound of a ticking clock in the background, and announcing the time every minute of broadcast.

Overview
The station is heard on various AM frequencies throughout the country and also on certain FM frequencies, such as 101.5 FM in Havana.

Listenership outside of Cuba
From its inception in 1947 until the Internet era, Radio Reloj was generally available only to listeners in Cuba. However, on occasion during a clear night (especially during the winter months), Radio Reloj could be heard in adjacent countries, and it generally has a good signal in areas immediately north of Havana such as the Florida Keys (from Islamorada to Key West) and some parts of Southwest Florida. A good example of DXing of Radio Reloj was on the morning of 21 January 1999 at 1:20am (Eastern Time), when US radio station WMCA, licensed in New York City and broadcasting on 570 AM (the same as Radio Reloj's Santa Clara signal), went off the air for transmitter maintenance. Once WMCA's carrier signal dropped, Radio Reloj's broadcast could be heard up and down the entire Eastern Seaboard of the United States including New York City, where WMCA broadcasts originate. 

Radio Reloj is also available free in satellite broadcast in Hispasat 30° W. Radio Reloj has also started broadcasting its programming via an Internet stream using any media player in decent albeit low bit-rate sound quality.

References

Reloj
News and talk radio stations
Time signal radio stations
Radio stations established in 1947
1947 establishments in Cuba